Lone Star is a city in Morris County, Texas, United States. The population was 1,581 at the 2010 census.

Geography

Lone Star is located at  (32.943105, –94.708017).

Demographics

As of the 2020 United States census, there were 1,993 people, 598 households, and 628 families residing in the city.

Education
Most of the city of Lone Star is served by the Daingerfield-Lone Star Independent School District.  A small portion also goes into the Hughes Springs ISD.

References

Cities in Texas
Cities in Morris County, Texas